Francesca Cavallo is an Italian bestselling author, entrepreneur and activist. She is the co-creator of Good Night Stories for Rebel Girls series, which has broken records on the crowdfunding website Kickstarter for publishing.

Biography
Cavallo's career began in theater, managing a theater company, and in 2011 turned to the development of Timbuktu Labs with Elena Favilli, which published a children's magazine for iPads, also called Timbuktu.

The iPad magazine Timbuktu (produced by Timbuktu Labs) was the first iPad magazine for children  and it presented the news to children as a form of entertainment. The magazine utilized colorful pictures, easy-to-read language, and sound to appeal to children, and top-down scrolling vs. the traditional page flipping style of a magazine.

The first volume of Good Night Stories for Rebel Girls was published in 2016, and has since been translated into 47 languages.

Works
Good Night Stories for Rebel Girls Volume 1 & 2
I am a Rebel Girl: a Journal to Start Revolutions
Elfi al Quinto Piano

Awards
PW Star Watch 2018 Superstar

References

Sources

Year of birth missing (living people)
Living people
University of Milan alumni
Italian women writers
Italian businesspeople